Mauston–New Lisbon Union Airport  is a joint city owned public use airport located 3 miles (5 km) southeast of the central business district of New Lisbon, Wisconsin, a city in Juneau County, Wisconsin, United States. It is also owned by the city of Mauston, Wisconsin, a city of the same county. It is included in the Federal Aviation Administration (FAA) National Plan of Integrated Airport Systems for 2021–2025, in which it is categorized as a local general aviation facility.

Although most airports in the United States use the same three-letter location identifier for the FAA and International Air Transport Association (IATA), this airport is assigned 82C by the FAA but has no designation from the IATA.

Facilities and aircraft 
Mauston–New Lisbon Union Airport covers an area of 248 acres (100 ha) at an elevation of 908 feet (277 m) above mean sea level. It has one runway: 14/32 is 3,688 by 75 feet (1,124 x 23 m) with an asphalt surface, it has approved GPS approaches.

For the 12-month period ending April 9, 2021, the airport had 10,390 aircraft operations, an average of 28 per day: 97% general aviation, 3% air taxi and less than 1% military.
In January 2023, there were 26 aircraft based at this airport: all 26 single-engine.

See also
List of airports in Wisconsin

References

External links 
 

 AirportGuide airport information for 61C

Airports in Wisconsin
Buildings and structures in Juneau County, Wisconsin